Clément Duval (1850–1935) was a famous French anarchist and criminal. His ideas concerning individual reclamation were greatly influential in later shaping illegalism. According to Paul Albert, "The story of Clement Duval was lifted and, shorn of all politics, turned into the bestseller Papillon."

Biography

In October 1886, Duval broke into the mansion of a Parisian socialite and stole 15,000 francs before accidentally setting the house on fire. He was caught only two weeks later after trying to fence the stolen goods, stabbing a policeman named Rossignol several times during his arrest (the policeman survived his wounds). Duval's trial drew crowds of supporters and ended in chaos when Duval was dragged from the court, crying, "Long live anarchy!" He was condemned to death, but his sentence was later commuted to hard labor on Devil's Island, French Guiana.

In a letter printed in the November 1886 issue of the anarchist paper Le Révolté, Duval famously declared: "Le vol n'est que la restitution, opéré à son profit par un individu conscient des richesses produites collectivement, et indûment accaparée par quelques-uns." ("Theft is but restitution carried out by an individual to his own benefit, being conscious of another's undue monopolization of collectively produced wealth.")

Memoir
In 1929, Duval's memoir, Memorie Autobiografiche, was translated by Luigi Galleani and published in Italian. In 1980, Marianne Enckell, at C.I.R.A. in Lausanne, recovered part of Duval's original manuscript, and had it published as Outrage: An Anarchist Memoir of the Penal Colony.

See also 
 René Belbenoît
 Bonnot gang
 Expropriative anarchism
 The Panther of Batignolles

References

1850 births
1935 deaths
French anarchists
French prisoners sentenced to death
Illegalists
Prisoners sentenced to death by France
French escapees
Individualist anarchists
Escapees from French detention
French emigrants to the United States
Devil's Island inmates
Anarchism in French Guiana
19th-century French criminals
20th-century French criminals